Cynthia Bergstrom is a costume designer.  She worked on the Wes Craven movie Scream and this then led to work on the TV series Buffy the Vampire Slayer from its second season.

References

Costume designers
Living people
Year of birth missing (living people)